The 35th German Skeleton Championship 2001 was organized on 14 January 2001 in Königssee.

Men

Women

External links 
  Resultlist

Skeleton championships in Germany
2001 in German sport
2001 in skeleton